This article provides an incomplete list of fiction books set in New York City. Included is the date of first publication.

Books for adults

Nineteenth century

1800s
 A History of New York - Washington Irving (1809)

1860s
Ragged Dick - Horatio Alger (1868)

1880s
Washington Square - Henry James (1880)
A Hazard of New Fortunes - William Dean Howells (1889)

1890s
 Maggie: A Girl of the Streets - Stephen Crane (1893)
 Yekl: A Tale of the New York Ghetto - Abraham Cahan (1896)

Twentieth century

1900s
 The House of Mirth - Edith Wharton (1905)
 The Melting Pot - Israel Zangwill (1908)
 Ashes of Roses  - Mary Jane Auch (1911)
 The Custom of the Country - Edith Wharton (1913)
 The Rise of David Levinsky - Abraham Cahan (1917)

1920s
 The Age of Innocence - Edith Wharton (1920)
 The Beautiful and Damned - F. Scott Fitzgerald (1922)
 Old New York - Edith Wharton (1924)
 Bread Givers - Anzia Yezierska (1925)
 The Great Gatsby - F. Scott Fitzgerald (1925)
 Manhattan Transfer - John Dos Passos (1925)
 The Island Within - Ludwig Lewisohn (1928)
 Plum Bun - Jessie Redmon Fauset (1929)

1930s
 Jews Without Money - Michael Gold (1930)
 Doc Savage pulp fiction series - Kenneth Robeson (1933-1949)
 Miss Lonelyhearts - Nathanael West (1933)
 Call It Sleep - Henry Roth (1934)
 The Thin Man - Dashiell Hammett (1934)
 Turn, Magic Wheel - Dawn Powell (1936)

1940s
 The Fountainhead - Ayn Rand (1943)
 Laura - Vera Caspary (1943)
 A Tree Grows in Brooklyn - Betty Smith (1943)
 The Big Clock - Kenneth Fearing (1946)
 The Deadly Percheron - John Franklin Bardin (1946)
 The Street - Ann Petry (1946)
 Three Bedrooms in Manhattan - Georges Simenon (1946)
 East Side, West Side - Marcia Davenport (1947)
 I, the Jury - Mickey Spillane (1947)
 The Last of Phillip Banter - John Franklin Bardin (1947)
 The Victim - Saul Bellow (1947)
 Consider Her Ways - Frederick Philip Grove (1948)

1950s
 The Caine Mutiny - Herman Wouk (1951)
 The Catcher in the Rye - J. D. Salinger (1951)
 A Walker in the City - Alfred Kazin (1951)
 Go - John Clellon Holmes (1952)
 Invisible Man- Ralph Ellison (1952) 
 The Caves of Steel - Isaac Asimov (1953)
 Go Tell It On The Mountain  -  James Baldwin  (1953)
 Cities in Flight (series) - James Blish (1955-1962)
 Marjorie Morningstar - Herman Wouk (1955)
 Atlas Shrugged - Ayn Rand (1957)
 Bunny Lake Is Missing - Merriam Modell (writing as Evelyn Piper) (1957)
 Breakfast at Tiffany's - Truman Capote (1958)
 Brown Girl, Brownstones - Paule Marshall (1959)

1960s
 Franny and Zooey - J. D. Salinger (1961)
 Another Country - James Baldwin (1962)
 The Bell Jar - Sylvia Plath (1963)
 The Group - Mary McCarthy (1963)
 Joy in the Morning - Betty Smith (1963)
 Raise High the Roof Beam, Carpenters and Seymour: An Introduction - J. D. Salinger (1963)
 Joe Gould's Secret - Joseph Mitchell (1964)
 Last Exit to Brooklyn - Hubert Selby (1964)
 Brendan Behan's New York - Brendan Behan (1964)
 A Singular Man - J. P. Donleavy (1964)
 An American Dream - Norman Mailer (1964)
  The Warriors (Yurick novel) - Sol Yurick (1965)
 The Doorbell Rang - Rex Stout (1965)
 The Fortunate Pilgrim - Mario Puzo (1965)
 Make Room! Make Room! - Harry Harrison (1966)
 A Queer Kind of Death - George Baxt (1966)
 The Butterfly Kid - Chester Anderson (1967)
 The Chosen - Chaim Potok (1967)
 Rosemary's Baby - Ira Levin (1967)
 Swing Low, Sweet Harriet - George Baxt (1967)
 Tell Me How Long the Train's Been Gone James Baldwin  (1968)
 My Sister Eileen - Ruth McKenney (1968)
 The Godfather - Mario Puzo (1969)
 Topsy and Evil - George Baxt (1969)

1970s
 Desperate Characters - Paula Fox (1970)
 Mr. Sammler's Planet - Saul Bellow (1970)
 Time and Again - Jack Finney (1970)
 Enemies - Isaac Bashevis Singer (1972)
 Umbrella Steps - Julie Goldsmith Gilbert (1972)
 A Bomb Built in Hell - Andrew Vachss (1973)
 A Fairytale of New York - J. P. Donleavy (1973)
 Great Jones Street - Don DeLillo (1973)
 Sheila Levine Is Dead and Living in New York - Gail Parent (1973)
 The Taking of Pelham One Two Three - Morton Freedgood (1973)
 If Beale Street Could Talk James Baldwin (1974)
 Looking for Mr. Goodbar - Judith Rossner (1975)
 Sophie's Choice - William Styron (1976)
 Players - Don DeLillo (1977)
 A Contract with God - Will Eisner (1978)
 Dancer from the Dance - Andrew Holleran (1978)
 Faggots - Larry Kramer (1978)
 Happy All the Time - Laurie Colwin (1978)
 The Stand - Stephen King (1978)

1980s
 L is for Lion: an italian bronx butch freedom memoir - Annie Lanzillotto (1981)
 The Dark Tower: The Gunslinger - Stephen King (1982)
 Last Angry Man - Gerald Green (1983)
 Winter's Tale - Mark Helprin (1983)
 Bright Lights, Big City - Jay McInerney (1984)
 Duplicate Keys - Jane Smiley (1984)
 Banana Fish (manga series) - Akimi Yoshida (1985-1994)
 Blood Music - Greg Bear (1985)
 Flood - Andrew Vachss (1985)
 The New York Trilogy - Paul Auster (1985-86)
 The Bachelor's Bride - Stephen Koch (1986)
 Dreams of an Average Man -Dyan Sheldon (1986)
 Money - Martin Amis (1986)
 Social Disease - Paul Rudnick (1986)
 War Cries Over Avenue C - Jerome Charyn (1986)
 The Bonfire of the Vanities - Tom Wolfe (1987)
 The Dark Tower II: The Drawing of the Three - Stephen King (1987)
 Ice and Fire - Andrea Dworkin (1987)
 Knight Life - Peter David (1987)
 Paradise Man - Jerome Charyn (1987)
 Stars and Bars - William Boyd (1987)
 Strega - Andrew Vachss (1987)
 The Year of Silence - Madison Smartt Bell (1987)
 Blue Belle - Andrew Vachss (1988)
 People Like Us - Dominick Dunne (1988)
 The Crazy Kill - Chester Himes (1989)
 Emma Who Saved My Life - Wilton Barnhardt (1989)
 Hard Candy - Andrew Vachss (1989)
 I Pass Like Night - Jonathan Ames (1989)

1990s
 Billy Bathgate - E.L. Doctorow (1990)
 Children of the Night - Mercedes Lackey (1990)
 A Home at the End of the World - Michael Cunningham (1990)
 The Mambo Kings Play Songs of Love - Oscar Hijuelos (1990)
 Moon Palace - Paul Auster (1990)
 Our House in the Last World - Oscar Hijuelos (1990)
 Skinny Legs and All - Tom Robbins (1990)
 Aftershock - Chuck Scarborough (1991)
 American Psycho - Bret Easton Ellis (1991)
 Day of Atonement - Faye Kellerman (1991)
 Sacrifice - Andrew Vachss (1991)
 Sliver - Ira Levin (1991)
 The Blindfold - Siri Hustvedt (1992)
 The First Wives Club - Olivia Goldsmith (1992)
 Good Fairies of New York - Martin Millar (1992)
 Sweet Liar - Jude Deveraux (1992)
 The Kaisho - Eric Lustbader (1993)
 A Mother's Love - Mary Morris (1993)
 Nude Men - Amanda Filipacchi (1993)
 Closing Time - Joseph Heller (1994)
 Down in the Zero - Andrew Vachss (1994)
 A Feather on the Breath of God - Sigrid Nunez (1994)
 Just Like That - Lily Brett (1994)
 The Alienist - Caleb Carr (1995)
 Footsteps of the Hawk - Andrew Vachss (1995)
 Full Stop - Joan Smith (1995)
 The Lady Who Liked Clean Restrooms - J. P. Donleavy (1995)
 One Coffee With - Margaret Maron (1995)
 World's Fair - E.L. Doctorow (1996)
 The Book of Night with Moon - Diane Duane (1997)
 A History of Violence - John Wagner (1997)
 Lives of the Monster Dogs - Kirsten Bakis (1997)
 Martin Dressler: The Tale of an American Dreamer - Steven Millhauser (1997)
 Sewer, Gas and Electric - Matt Ruff (1997)
 Sex and the City - Candace Bushnell (1997)
 Snow in August - Pete Hamill (1997)
 Underworld - Don DeLillo (1997)
 The Waterworks - E.L. Doctorow (1997)
 Always Hiding - Sophia G. Romero (1998)
 Bringing Out The Dead - Joe Connelly (1998)
 The Extra Man - Jonathan Ames (1998)
 The Hours - Michael Cunningham (1998)
 Last Days of Summer - Steve Kluger (1998)
 Of Kings and Planets - Ethan Canin (1998)
 Safe House - Andrew Vachss (1998)
 The Willow Tree - Hubert Selby, Jr. (1998)
 Wrong Information is being Given Out at Princeton - J. P. Donleavy (1998)
 The Broken Hearts Club - Ethan Black (1999)
 Choice of Evil - Andrew Vachss (1999)
 Downsiders - Neal Shusterman (1999)
 Glamorama - Bret Easton Ellis (1999)
 Liberty Falling - Nevada Barr (1999)
 Morningside Heights - Cheryl Mendelson (1999)
 Motherless Brooklyn - Jonathan Lethem (1999)
 The Silk Code - Paul Levinson (1999)
 Vapor - Amanda Filipacchi (1999)
 Murder on Astor Place (Gaslight Mystery series) - Victoria Thompson (1999)

Twenty-first century

2000s
 The 25th Hour - David Benioff (2000)
 The Amazing Adventures of Kavalier & Clay - Michael Chabon (2000)
 Bodega Dreams - Ernesto Quiñonez (2000)
 City of God - E. L. Doctorow (2000)
 Killing Time - Caleb Carr (2000)
 Minor Miracles - Will Eisner (2000)
 Murder in Central Park - Michael Jahn (2000)
 The Night Inspector - Frederick Busch (2000)
 The Princess Diaries (series) - Meg Cabot (2000)
 Redemption Song - Bertice Berry (2000)
 The Toy Collector - James Gunn (2000)
 About the Author - John Colapinto (2001)
 Bad Connection - Michael Ledwidge (2001)
 Black Water Transit - Carsten Stroud (2001)
 Borrowed Tides - Paul Levinson (2001)
 Box Office Poison - Alex Robinson (2001)
 Clara Callan - Richard B. Wright (2001)
 The Corrections - Jonathan Franzen (2001)
 Fixer Chao - Han Ong (2001)
 The Foreigner - Meg Castaldo (2001)
 The Fourth Angel -Suzanne Chazin (2001)
 Going, Going, Gone - Jack Womack (2001)
 The Good People of New York - Thisbe Nissen (2001)
 The Grand Complication - Allen Kurzweil (2001)
 The Haunting of Hip Hop - Bertice Berry (2001)
 Hell's Kitchen - Chris Niles (2001)
 High Maintenance - Jennifer Belle (2001)
 The Hum Bug - Harold Schechter (2001)
 Jeremy Thrane - Kate Christensen (2001)
 Kissing in Manhattan - David Schickler (2001)
 Look at Me - Jennifer Egan (2001)
 Lucky Us - Joan Silber (2001)
 The Manhattan Hunt Club - John Saul (2001)
 Murphy's Law - Rhys Bowen (2001)
 Rivington Street - Meredith Tax (2001)
 Saturn's Return to New York - Sara Gran (2001)
 Shooting Dr. Jack - Norman Green (2001)
 Absolute Rage - Robert K. Tanenbaum (2002)
 The Consciousness Plague - Paul Levinson (2002)
 Death of Riley - Rhys Bowen (2002)
 Disturbing the Peace - Nancy Newman (2002)
 Dreamland - Kevin Baker (2002)
 The Nanny Diaries - Emma McLaughlin and Nicola Kraus (2002)
 The Navigator of New York - Wayne Johnston (2002)
 Only Child - Andrew Vachss (2002)
 Paradise Alley - Kevin Baker (2002)
 Pipsqueak - Brian Wiprud (2002)
 Save Karyn - Karyn Bosnak (2002)
 Shopaholic Takes Manhattan - Sophie Kinsella (2002)
 The Tea Rose - Jennifer Donally (2002)
 Three Junes - Julia Glass (2002)
 The Anniversary - Amy Gutman (2003)
 The Fortress Of Solitude  Jonathan Lethem  (2003)
 Carrie Pilby - Caren Lissner (2003)
 Cosmopolis - Don DeLillo (2003)
 Dead for Life - Ethan Black (2003)
 The Devil Wears Prada - Lauren Weisberger (2003)
 For the Love of Mike - Rhys Bowen (2003)
 For Matrimonial Purposes - Kavita Daswani (2003)
 Forever - Pete Hamill (2003)
 The Furies - Fernanda Eberstadt (2003)
 Hex - Maggie Estep (2003)
 Imitation in Death - J.D. Robb (2003)
 A Killing Gift - Leslie Glass (2003)
 Kunma - Frank Corsaro (2003)
 The Last Good Day - Peter Blauner (2003)
 Love Me - Garrison Keillor (2003)
 Lucia, Lucia - Adriana Trigiani (2003)
 Moral Hazard - Kate Jennings (2003)
 The Name of the Game - Will Eisner (2003)
 Oracle Night - Paul Auster (2003)
 Pattern Recognition - William Ford Gibson (2003)
 The Pixel Eye - Paul Levinson (2003)
 The Quality of Life Report - Meghan Daum (2003)
 Sheet Music - M. J. Rose (2003)
 Shopaholic Ties the Knot - Sophie Kinsella (2003)
 Small Town - Lawrence Block (2003)
 What I Loved - Siri Hustvedt (2003)
 Absent Friends - S. J. Rozan (2004)
 An Almost Perfect Moment - Binnie Kirshenbaum (2004)
 Bergdorf Blondes - Plum Sykes (2004)
 Between Two Rivers - Nicholas Rinaldi (2004)
 East Side Story - Louis Auchincloss (2004)
 Down Here - Andrew Vachss (2004)
 The Green and the Gray - Timothy Zahn (2004)
 In the Shadow of No Towers - Art Spiegelman (2004)
 Joy Comes in the Morning - Jonathan Rosen (2004)
 Love Monkey - Kyle Smith (2004)
 Matzo Ball Heiress - Laurie Gwen Shapiro (2004)
 Monster Island - David Wellington (August 2004)
 Nellie's Promise - Valerie Tripp (2004)
 Oh, Play That Thing - Roddy Doyle (2004)
 The Outside World - Tova Mirvis (2004)
 Solos - Kitty Burns Florey (2004)
 The Dark Tower VI: Song of Susannah - Stephen King (2004)
 Under the Manhattan Bridge - Irene Marcuse (2004)
 The White Rose - Jean Hanff Korelitz (2004)
 The Brooklyn Follies - Paul Auster (2005)
 The Curse of Ravenscourt: A Samantha Mystery - Sarah Masters Buckey & Jean-Paul Tibbles (2005)
 Everyone Worth Knowing - Lauren Weisberger (2005)
 Extremely Loud and Incredibly Close - Jonathan Safran Foer (2005)
 The History of Love - Nicole Krauss (2005)
 In Like Flynn - Rhys Bowen (2005)
 Love Creeps - Amanda Filipacchi (2005)
 Summer Crossing - Truman Capote (2005; posthumously)
 Metropolis - Elizabeth Gaffney (2005)
 Pinkerton's Sister - Peter Rushforth (2005)
 The Year of Magical Thinking - Joan Didion (2005)
 Beautiful Lies - Lisa Unger (2006)
 Oh Danny Boy - Rhys Bowen (2006)
 Nightlife - Rob Thurman (2006)
 The Emperor's Children - Claire Messud (2006)
 Mask Market - Andrew Vachss (2006)
 The Plot to Save Socrates - Paul Levinson (2006)
 The Righteous Men - Sam Bourne (2006)
 Rise and Shine - Anna Quindlen (2006)
 Size 12 Is Not Fat - Meg Cabot (2006)
 Size 14 Is Not Fat Either - Meg Cabot (2006)
 Tyrell - Coe Booth (2006)
 The Year of Endless Sorrows - Adam Rapp (2006)
 Big Boned - Meg Cabot (2007)
 Exit Ghost - Philip Roth (2007)
 Moonshine - Rob Thurman (2007)
 Queen of Babble in the Big City - Meg Cabot (2007)
 The Invention of Everything Else - Samantha Hunt (2008)
 Lush Life - Richard Price (2008)
 Madhouse - Rob Thurman (2008)
 Netherland - Joseph O'Neill (2008)
 The Associate - John Grisham (2009)
 Chronic City - Jonathan Lethem (2009)
 Deathwish - Rob Thurman (2009)
 Let the Great World Spin - Colum McCann (2009)
 New York - Edward Rutherfurd (2009)

2010s
 The Thieves of Manhattan - Adam Langer (2010)
 A Manhã do Mundo, The Morning of the World - Pedro Guilherme-Moreira (2011)
 Tabloid City: A Novel - Pete Hamill (2011)
 Open City - Teju Cole  (2012)
 The Gods of Gotham - Lyndsay Faye (2012)
 The Man Who Wouldn't Stand Up - Jacob M. Appel (2012)
 The Submission - Amy Waldman (2012)
 The Biology of Luck - Jacob M. Appel (2013)
 Bleeding Edge - Thomas Pynchon (2013)
 The Goldfinch - Donna Tartt (2013)
 The Interestings: A Novel - Meg Wolitzer (2013)
 Modern Lovers - Emma Staub (2016)
 A Little Life - Hanya Yanagihara (2016)
An Absolutely Remarkable Thing - Hank Green (2018)
 My Year of Rest and Relaxation - Ottessa Moshfegh (2018)
 The Outlaws of Maroon - John Curl (2019)
 Luster - Raven Leilani (2020)

Books for children

1870s
 Eight Cousins - Louisa May Alcott (1874)
 Rose in Bloom (sequel to Eight Cousins) - Louisa May Alcott (c. 1876)

Twentieth century

1930s
 Roller Skates - Ruth Sawyer (1936)

1940s
 The Matchlock Gun - Walter D. Edmonds (1941)
 The Saturdays - Elizabeth Enright (1941)
 Stuart Little - E.B. White (1945)

1950s
 All-of-a-Kind Family - Sydney Taylor (1951)
 Camilla - Madeleine L'Engle (1951)
 Eloise - Kay Thompson (1955)

1960s
 The Cricket in Times Square - George Selden (1960)
 It's Like This, Cat - Emily Cheney Neville (1963)
 Harriet the Spy - Louise Fitzhugh (1964)
 The Pushcart War - Jean Merrill (1964)
 The Long Secret - Louise Fitzhugh (1965)
 The Jazz Man - Mary Hays Weik (1966)
 The Contender - Robert Lipsyte (1967)
 From the Mixed-Up Files of Mrs. Basil E. Frankweiler - E.L. Konigsburg (1967)
 Jennifer, Hecate, Macbeth, William McKinley, and Me, Elizabeth - E.L. Konigsburg (1967)
 The Young Unicorns - Madeleine L'Engle (1968)

1970s
 The Planet of Junior Brown - Virginia Hamilton (1971)
 Freaky Friday - Mary Rodgers (1972)
 Tales of a Fourth Grade Nothing - Judy Blume (1972)
 The Genie of Sutton Place - George Selden (1973)
 Nobody's Family is Going to Change - Louise Fitzhugh (1974)
 A Billion for Boris (alt. title: ESP TV) - Mary Rodgers (1976)
 Alan and Naomi - Myron Levoy (1977)

1980s
 Sarah Bishop - Scott O'Dell (1980)
 Superfudge - Judy Blume (1980)
 Annie on my Mind - Nancy Garden (1982)
 Sometimes I Think I Hear My Name - Avi (1982)
 Summer Switch - Mary Rodgers (1982)
 The One Hundredth Thing About Caroline - Lois Lowry (1983)
 So You Want to Be a Wizard - Diane Duane (1983)
 In the Year of the Boar and Jackie Robinson - Bette Bao Lord (1984)
 Motown and Didi - Walter Dean Myers (1984)
 The Bronze King - Suzy McKee Charnas (1985)
 The Cave Under the City - Harry Mazer (1986)
 A Rat's Tale - Tor Seidler (1986)
 Slake's Limbo - Felice Holman (1986)
 Charley Skedaddle - Patricia Beatty (1987)
 Remember Me to Harold Square - Paula Danziger (1987)
 Scorpions - Walter Dean Myers (1988)
 Silver Days - Sonia Levitin (1989)

1990s
 Babyface - Norma Fox Mazer (1990)
 Berts vidare betraktelser - Anders Jacobsson and Sören Olsson (1990)
 Caperucita en Manhattan - Carmen Martín Gaite (1990)
 The Mouse Rap - Walter Dean Myers (1990)
 Voices After Midnight - Richard Peck (1990)
 Monkey Island - Paula Fox (1991)
 Nothing To Fear - Jackie French Koller (1991)
 The Pigman and Me - Paul Zindel (1991)
 Amy Elizabeth Explores Bloomingdale's - E.L. Konigsburg (1992)
 Jumper - Steven Gould (1992)
 Letters from Rifka - Karen Hesse (1992)
 Who Was That Masked Man, Anyway? - Avi (1992)
 Amy Dunn Quits School - Susan Richards Shreve (1993)
 City of Light, City of Dark - Avi (1993)
 The Kingdom of Kevin Malone - Suzy McKee Charnas (1993)
 Missing Angel Juan - Francesca Lia Block (1993)
 Scooter - Vera B. Williams (1993)
 Behind the Lines - Isabelle Holland (1994)
 Brooklyn Doesn't Rhyme - Joan W. Blos (1994)
 Rite of Passage - Richard Wright (1994)
 2095 - Jon Scieszka (1995)
 Adam Zigzag - Barbara Barrie (1995)
 Lost In Cyberspace - Richard Peck (1995)
 The Thief from Five Points - Louise Fitzhugh (1995)
 Another Way to Dance - Martha Southgate (1996)
 No-Thanks Thanksgiving - Ilene Cooper (1996)
 Lily's Crossing - Patricia Reilly Giff (1997)
 Where You Belong - Mary Ann McGuigan (1997)
 Berts Babyface - Anders Jacobsson and Sören Olsson (1998)
 Jazmin's Notebook - Nikki Grimes (1998)
 The Kidnappers - Willo Davis Roberts (1998)
 The Other Shepards - Adele Griffin (1998)
 Dave at Night - Gail Carson Levine (1999)
 Downsiders - Neal Shusterman (1999)
 In the Forests of the Night - Amelia Atwater-Rhodes (1999)
 Paperboy - Isabelle Holland (1999)
 Rats - Paul Zindel (1999)

Twenty-first century

2000s
 Love and Other Four-Letter Words - Carolyn Mackler (2000)
 Miracle's Boys - Jacqueline Woodson (2000)
 Over the Wall - John H. Ritter (2000)
 Princess Diaries (series) - Meg Cabot (2000)
 When I Dream of Heaven: Angelina's Story - Steven Kroll (2000)
 6-321 - Michael Laser (2001)
 All The Way Home - Patricia Reilly Giff (2001)
 Chipper - James Lincoln Collier (2001)
 Don't You Know There's A War On? - Avi (2001)
 The Revenge of Randall Reese-Rat - Tor Seidler (2001)
 The School Story - Andrew Clements (2001)
 Secret in St. Something - Barbara Brooks Wallace (2001)
 Spellbound - Janet McDonald (2001)
 Ashes of Roses - Mary Jane Auch (2002)
 Bluish - Virginia Hamilton (2002)
 Boy Next Door - Meg Cabot (2002)
 Chill Wind - Janet McDonald (2002)
 Frog King - Adam Davies (2002)
 Gossip Girl - Cecily von Ziegesar (2002)
 Hey Kid, Want to Buy a Bridge? - Jon Scieszka (2002)
 Micawber - John Lithgow (2002)
 My Heartbeat - Garret Freymann-Weyr (2002)
 Twelve - Nick McDonell (2002)
 Vampire State Building - Elizabeth Levy (2002)
 The World of Henry Orient - Nora Johnson (2002)
 Gregor the Overlander (series) - Suzanne Collins (2003)
  Pattie's Best Deal -Dawn Dittmar (2003)
 A House of Tailors - Patricia Reilly Giff (2004)
 It Can't Rain This Hard Forever -Dawn Dittmar (2004)
 City of Bones - Cassandra Clare (2005)
 Percy Jackson and the Olympians series - Rick Riordan (2005)
 Brookland - Emily Barton (2006)
 Missing You - Meg Cabot (2006)
 Jinx - Meg Cabot (2007)
 The Night Tourist - Katherine Marsh (2007)
 Mine All Mine - Adam Davies (2008)
 When You Reach Me - Rebecca Stead (2009)

2010s
 Lowboy - John Wray (2010)
 The Murderer's Daughters - Randy Susan Meyers (2010)
 TimeRiders - Alex Scarrow (2010)
 TimeRiders: Day of the Predator - Alex Scarrow (2010)
 Open City - Teju Cole (2011)
 Bunheads - Sophie Flack (2011)
 TimeRiders: The Doomsday Code - Alex Scarrow (2011)
 TimeRiders: The Eternal War - Alex Scarrow (2011)
 TimeRiders: Gates of Rome - Alex Scarrow (2012)
 New York Stories - Renald Iacovelli (2013)
 Modern Lovers-- Emma Straub (2016)
2020s
 The City We Became - N. K. Jemisin (2020)

References

New York City
New York City in popular culture
 
New York City
Books